The Kunyu Quantu, or Full Map of the World, was a map of the world developed by Jesuit father Ferdinand Verbiest during his mission in China in 1674. A copy is in the Hunterian Museum.

The map follows the earlier works of Matteo Ricci, such as the Kunyu Wanguo Quantu.

See also
 Wanguo Quantu

Notes

External links
 The Super Map. NPM's Anime Carnival (exhibit). Taipei: National Palace Museum.

World maps
1674 works
17th century in China
Historic maps of the world
17th-century maps and globes